William Ridley (14 September 1819 – 26 September 1878) was an English Presbyterian missionary who studied Australian Aboriginal languages, particularly Gamilaraay.

Early life and education
Ridley was born in Hartford End, Essex, England. He was educated at King's College and University of London where he graduated B.A. Dr. John Lang brought him to Australia and he arrived on the Clifton in Sydney on 19 March 1850. Ridley taught languages at the Australian College.

Career
Ridley was ordained in the Scots Church by Lang in 1850, the following year he was appointed to Dungog, New South Wales. In 1853 he began an itinerant ministry in the New England region. This was extended in 1855 to include Moreton Bay where he formed the Moreton Bay Aborigines Friends' Society in February. In the same year he published Report … of a Journey Along the Condamine, Barwan and Namoi Rivers , and in 1856 published Gurre Kamilaroi: or Kamilaroi Sayings.

In 1857 Ridley resumed parish work with the United Presbyterian Church of Victoria at Portland, Victoria, the next year he returned to Sydney and in 1861 became a journalist. He was assistant editor of the Empire, then editor of the Evening News in 1873, and the Australian Town and Country Journal. He also helped edit the Australian Witness for two years and also wrote for the Sydney University Magazine. In conjunction with Dr. Robert Steel he obtained government aid for the Maloga mission. Ridley published Kamilaroi, Dippil, and Turrubul: Languages Spoken by Australian Aborigines in 1866, revised and enlarged as Kamilaroi and Other Australian Languages in 1875, which was well received. Ridley also contributed to the works of R. B. Smyth and E. M. Curr.

In 1861 he provided an opinion to the Select Committee on the Native Police Force of Queensland. This was regarding "considerations as to the means to be adopted for civilizing the Aborigines of Australia, suggested by a three-years' mission among that people."

References

External links
 
 
 
 Select Committee on the Native Police Force. 1861 pages 165, 166. https://aiatsis.gov.au/sites/default/files/catalogue_resources/92123.pdf

1819 births
1878 deaths
Missionary linguists
English Presbyterian missionaries
Australian Presbyterians
Presbyterian missionaries in Australia
Ethnologists
Pre-Separation Queensland